Cleidson Rodrigues dos Santos or simply Cleidson (born 13 August 1988 in Campina Grande) is a Brazilian footballer who plays primarily as a left back. He currently plays for Itumbiara Esporte Clube.

A strong, versatile player who can deputise at centre back should the need arise, Cleidson was linked with several European clubs during the 2012 summer transfer window: most notably VfB Stuttgart of the German Bundesliga as well as Queens Park Rangers and Swansea City, then both of the English Premier League.

Cleidson earned one cap for the Brazil U20 national football team in 2008 whilst a youth player at Treze.

Career statistics

External links
 ogol 

1988 births
Living people
Brazilian footballers
Treze Futebol Clube players
Sport Club do Recife players
Mogi Mirim Esporte Clube players
Itumbiara Esporte Clube players
Association football defenders